WERI-LP (channel 39) is a defunct low-powered television station which was licensed to serve and located in Keysville, Virginia.

History
The station signed on December 9, 1991, as W39BN located on channel 39. On February 21, 2000, W39BN changed its call letters to WERI-LP. WERI-LP was a sister station to both WFLV-LP (now defunct) and WKYV-LP (now WZTD-LD, a Telemundo network affiliate) but it later became a sister station to WFMA-LP, channel 52 in Farmville, Virginia & WSVL-LP, channel 48 in Keysville, Virginia.

The station was silent and its license remained active until October 27, 2010, at which point the licensee surrendered its license to the Federal Communications Commission (FCC). The FCC cancelled the license and deleted the WERI-LP call sign from its database.

External links

ERI-LP
Television channels and stations established in 1991
Defunct television stations in the United States
Television channels and stations disestablished in 2010
1991 establishments in Virginia
2010 disestablishments in Virginia
ERI-LP